1943 in the Philippines details events of note that happened in the Philippines in the year 1943.

Incumbents

Philippine Commonwealth

 President: Manuel Quezon (Nacionalista Party) 
 Vice President: Sergio Osmeña (Nacionalista Party) 
 Chief Justice: José Yulo
 Philippine National Assembly: National Assembly

Second Philippine Republic
President: José P. Laurel (starting October 14)
Prime Minister: Jorge B. Vargas (starting October 14)
Vice President: Benigno Aquino, Sr. (starting October 14)
Chief Justice: José Yulo

Events

May
 May 6 – Japanese Prime Minister Hideki Tojo visits the Philippines. A ceremony is held in Luneta in thanksgiving to the great Japanese Empire.
 May 28 – Shigenori Kuroda appointed as Japanese Military Governor (1942–1943)

June
 June 20 – Japanese Premier Hideki Tojo nominates an all Filipino 20 member Preparatory Commission for Philippine Independence.

September
 September 4 – The Philippine Preparatory Commission for Independence drafts a new Constitution which provides for a unicameral national assembly.
 September 20 – The 108 delegates to the National Assembly are chosen by the members of the Preparatory Commission for Philippine Independence.
 September 25 – A presidential election is held in the midst of World War II.

October
 October 14
 Jose P. Laurel elected President of the Philippines by the National Assembly.
 The puppet government is inaugurated. Laurel takes his oath of office.

November
 November – The Philippine economy collapses, the shortage of rice becomes serious.

Holidays

As per Act No. 2711 section 29, issued on March 10, 1917, any legal holiday of fixed date falls on Sunday, the next succeeding day shall be observed as legal holiday. Sundays are also considered legal religious holidays. Bonifacio Day was added through Philippine Legislature Act No. 2946. It was signed by then-Governor General Francis Burton Harrison in 1921. On October 28, 1931, the Act No. 3827 was approved declaring the last Sunday of August as National Heroes Day.

 January 1 – New Year's Day
 February 22 – Legal Holiday
 April 22 – Maundy Thursday
 April 23 – Good Friday
 May 1 – Labor Day
 July 4 – Philippine Republic Day
 August 13  – Legal Holiday
 August 29 – National Heroes Day
 November 25 – Thanksgiving Day
 November 30 – Bonifacio Day
 December 25 – Christmas Day
 December 30 – Rizal Day

Births
 April 3 – Subas Herrero, actor (d. 2013)
 May 4 – Andy Poe, actor and brother of Fernando Poe, Jr. (d. 1995)
 June 8 – Francisco Villaruz, Jr., Filipino justice.
 August 1 – Margarito Teves, secretary of Finance
 August 23 – Boots Plata, Filipino director (d. 2011)
 August 25 – Peque Gallaga, film director, screenwriter and actor (d. 2020)
 August 28 – Norberto Arceo, Filipino cyclist.
 September 5 – Dulce Saguisag, politician and Secretary of Social Welfare and Development (d. 2007)
 September 10 – Júnior (Filipino singer), singer and actor (d. 2014)
 September 11 – Horacio Morales, economist and politician (d. 2012)
 September 12 – Celso Ad. Castillo, film director and screenwriter (d. 2012)
 September 30 – Gemma Cruz-Araneta, politician, writer, director, and beauty queen.
 December 13 – Sergio Osmeña III, politician and senator

Death

References